Sinkata (sometimes Senkata) may refer to:
 Freweyni, previously named Sinkata, a town in the Ethiopian Tigray region
 the tabia of Sinkata, located south of this town